The following is a list of California locations by voter registration.

In October 2020, California had 22,047,448 registered voters, comprising 87.87% of its total eligible voters. Of those registered voters, 10,170,317 (46.10 percent) were registered Democrats,  5,334,323 (24.20 percent) were Republicans and, 5,283,853 were No Party Preference (24.00 percent).

The county with the highest percentage of registered Republicans was Modoc County, with registered Republicans comprising half of the registered voters. The ten counties with the highest percentage of registered Republicans are relatively small, with an average population of 91,776, and all but one are landlocked.

Similarly, the counties with the ten lowest percentages of registered voters are all relatively small and landlocked, with the exception of Monterey County. Kings County had the lowest percentage of registered voters, with just 34.7 percent of its population registered to vote. The two smallest counties in California by population also had the highest percentage of registered voters; Sierra County had the highest percentage, with 73.1 percent of its population registered to vote.

Inglewood had the highest percentage of registered Democrats of any place in California. The ten places with the highest percentage of registered Democrats all had high percentages of minorities (see California locations by race) and relatively low levels of income. On the other hand, Marin County, the highest income county in California by per capita income, had many more registered Democrats than Republicans. Further, of the ten highest-income counties in California by per capita income, all but Placer County, Orange County and El Dorado County had more registered Democrats than Republicans. But in yet another reversal, the place with the highest percentage of registered Republicans was Villa Park, which also has very high levels of income. Of the ten places in California with the highest percentage of registered Republicans, most have incomes above the state average (see California locations by income).

Entire state

Counties

Cities

See also 

 California
 California locations by crime rate
 California locations by income
 California locations by race
 Politics of California
 Political party strength in California

Notes

References 

California geography-related lists
Politics of California